Gina Beavers is an American artist. She was born in 1974, in Athens, Greece, and lives and works in Newark, New Jersey. She is best known for her bas-relief paintings of food, makeup, and images derived from the internet. The New Yorker  describes her paintings as “emphatically physical” and as a vindication of technology.

Education 
Beavers holds a BA in Studio Art and Anthropology from the University of Virginia, an MFA in Painting and Drawing from the School of the Art Institute of Chicago, and an MS in Art Education from Brooklyn College.

Exhibitions 
Beavers' work has been exhibited in solo exhibitions at MoMA PS1 in Queens, NY, CANADA Gallery in New York, NY, Gavin Brown's Enterprise in New York, NY, Cheim and Read Gallery in New York, NY, James Fuentes Gallery in New York, NY, Michael Benevento Gallery in Los Angeles, CA, and GNYP Gallery in Berlin, among other venues. Beavers has participated in numerous group exhibitions including at MoMA PS1, Kentucky Museum of Contemporary Art, the Nassau County Museum of Art, CANADA Gallery, and Night Gallery, Los Angeles. She is represented by Marianne Boesky Gallery in New York City and Carl Kostyál Gallery in London.

Solo exhibitions 

 Hilarisad, Carl Kostyál, Milan, 2019
 Tennis Ball Yellow, Carl Kostyál, London 2017

Group exhibitions 

 Stockholm Sessions, Carl Kostyál, Stockholm, 2021
 Malmö Sessions, Carl Kostyál, Ystadvagen, Malmö, Sweden, 2019
 Summer Show, Carl Kostyál, Stockholm, 2017

The Life I Deserve 
The Life I Deserve, Beavers' first solo museum exhibition, opened March 31, 2019 at MoMA PS1 in Queens, NY. This was a survey exhibition that incorporated Beavers' early "food porn" paintings together with her more work focused on subjects such as makeup, bodybuilders, and selfies gleaned from social media.

World War Me 
Beavers' exhibit World War Me showed at the Marianne Boesky Gallery in New York from September to October 2020. The show title was taken from a line from the show Sex and the City and the show grappled with the ways that we are pulled by current events and our preoccupation with ourselves.

Recognition 
Beavers' work has been discussed in the New York Times, ArtForum, Art in America, ArtNews, Modern Painters, the Los Angeles Times, and other publications.

External links 

 Official website
 Video interview, Whitehot Magazine
Spike Magazine

References 

American women painters
20th-century American painters
Living people
1974 births
20th-century American women artists
21st-century American women artists
School of the Art Institute of Chicago alumni
Brooklyn College alumni
University of Virginia alumni
Artists from Athens